The Macon Open also known as the Macon Indoor is a defunct men's tennis tournament played from 1968 to 1972. It was held in Macon, Georgia in the United States and played on carpet courts.

Results

Singles

Doubles

References 

Defunct tennis tournaments in the United States
Hard court tennis tournaments in the United States
Grand Prix tennis circuit